Friedrich Vogel may refer to:

 Friedrich Vogel (human geneticist) (1925–2006), human geneticist
 Friedrich Vogel (journalist) (1902–1976), German publisher (Handelsblatt)
 Friedrich Vogel, more commonly known as Frederick Vogel, an American tanner and businessman from Milwaukee, Wisconsin